

Marcollat is a locality in the Australian state of South Australia located in the state’s Limestone Coast region about  south-east of the state capital of Adelaide and about  north of the municipal seat in Kingston SE.

Boundaries were created in December 1998 for “the long established name” which is derived from the cadastral unit of the Hundred of Marcollat.

Marcollat is located entirely within the Hundred of Marcollat with the hundred’s south-west corner including part of the adjoining locality of Keilira.  The locality is served by the following roads - the Riddoch Highway which passes through the locality’s north-west corner from the north-west to the south-east en route to the regional centre of Mount Gambier and Rowney Road, described as a “secondary arterial road”, which passes from the north-east to the south-west en route to Kingston SE.

The principal land use within the locality is ‘primary production’ represented by “grazing (cattle and sheep) with some minor cropping (barley, safflower, sunflower)” with the following areas being reserved for conservation purposes - the Desert Camp Conservation Park, the Desert Camp Conservation Reserve and the Jip Jip Conservation Park.
 
The 2016 Australian census which was conducted in August 2016 reports that Marcollat had a population of 76 people.

Marcollat is located within the federal division of Barker, the state electoral district of MacKillop and the local government area of the Kingston District Council.

References

Marcollat
Marcollat